Luke Penny (born 8 February 1981) is a former Australian rules footballer.

Recruited to the Western Bulldogs in the 1998 AFL Draft as pick 14, Penny was seen as a project player who could lead the defence in years to come. He stood at 193 cm, and made his debut in 2000. With Matthew Croft at the club, he could not cement his spot at the Bulldogs, so was traded to St Kilda Football Club for pick 17 (which turned out to be Cameron Faulkner) in the 2002 AFL Draft.

Making his debut with the Saints in 2003, Penny continued to improve in a key-defensive position, and became first-choice full-back at the club. However, in 2004 and particularly 2005, Penny started having trouble with his knees. In 2005 he played just 9 games and was a figure in the Saints' massive injury list throughout the year. At the end of the 2005 season, Penny's knee injuries had become a massive problem and it was widely known that he was considering retirement. At just 24 years of age, on 29 November, Penny made his retirement official, with 3 years remaining on his contract.

References

External links
 
 

1981 births
Living people
St Kilda Football Club players
Western Bulldogs players
People educated at St Kevin's College, Melbourne
Australian rules footballers from Victoria (Australia)
Oakleigh Chargers players